The Stillwater Ngākawau Line (SNL), formerly the Stillwater–Westport Line (SWL) and the Ngakawau Branch, is a secondary main line, part of New Zealand's national rail network. It runs between Stillwater and Ngakawau via Westport on the West Coast of the South Island.

Construction 
A railway link from Greymouth east to Brunner was opened in 1876, but work on a link from this point to Westport became delayed for ten years by disputes over the best route to link the West Coast with Nelson and Canterbury.  Ultimately, the New Zealand Midland Railway Company (NZMRC) was formed to construct the route, and in 1886, work recommenced.  The junction of the route to Westport and the Midland Line to Canterbury was established just east of Brunner in Stillwater, and the NZMRC put most of its energy into the first portion of the SWL from Stillwater to Reefton.  This was due to the comparatively easier terrain faced by the route in the valley of the Grey River, and in 1889, the line was opened to Ngahere.  On 29 February 1892, the NZMRC opened the line all the way to the south bank of the Inangahua River, directly opposite Reefton, and with the Stillwater–Reefton portion complete in their view, they redirected their energy to the Midland route from Stillwater to Otira.

In the mid-1890s the NZMRC ran out of funds and, after a dispute in the courts, was taken over by the central government.  Work on the SWL recommenced in the 20th century, with the Inangahua River bridged, the present-day Reefton station established, and a further section to Cronadun opened in 1908.  At the Westport end, construction also commenced, with a 9 km line opened in 1912 from Westport to Te Kuha at the western end of the Lower Buller Gorge.  In 1914, the line from Cronadun reached Inangahua Junction, where the NZMRC intended its lines to Westport and Nelson to diverge (in fact, Inangahua remained the probable site for a junction until all work on the Nelson Section ceased in 1931).  However, the outbreak of World War I brought a halt to construction with only the section through the Buller Gorge to complete.

The Buller Gorge posed many difficulties for construction, but most of the formation and 2 of the remaining 12 bridges had been built, when Parliament voted 40:22 on 8 October 1931 to back a Railway Board proposal to stop work on the Westport-Inangahua line as well. The Labour leader, Harry Holland, suggested, "the influence of the oil interests against the national railways". Some of the workers were transferred to road building. Only after the 1935 election brought about a change in government was there a serious push to complete the line (as well as the similarly postponed Main North Line). Work was formally restarted on 16 July 1936 with a first sod ceremony. The outbreak of World War II created further delays on construction, but this time, work continued through wartime, including electric signalling, a turntable at Westport and easing of grades at Omoto, Jacksons and Stillwater. The 'last spike' ceremony was on 2 December 1941.  The Public Works Department was in charge of construction and were able to operate trains the length of the line by July 1942, but ownership of the route was not transferred to the New Zealand Railways Department until 5 December 1943.

Operation 

Before the line was completed, mixed trains operated on sections open for service, and between August 1936 and August 1938 a daily morning railcar service was provided from Hokitika on the Ross Branch to Reefton and return by a diminutive Midland railcar.  Once the line was completed Vulcan railcars operated from Westport to Stillwater, where they connected with services to Christchurch, and a local service ran between Greymouth and Reefton. From 7 September 1942 there were two railcars each way between Greymouth and Westport, taking a little over 3½ hours. The poor roads in the region meant there was more demand for a passenger service than on many other rural routes in New Zealand that lost their passenger services by 1940, but road upgrades led to increasing competition from the private car and all passenger services on the line ceased in 1967, due to the deteriorating mechanical condition of the railcars.

Commodities such as coal, timber, and cement have been the mainstay of freight on the line, and in the 1950s, when coal was still shipped from Westport and Greymouth, the occasional closure of one port meant every operational locomotive on the West Coast was pushed into duty to haul coal up or down the SWL to the other port.  Today, the coal traffic still exists in substantial quantities, but it is no longer shipped from West Coast ports; it is carried by train to the deep harbour in Lyttelton on the east coast.

When the line was completed, UC class steam locomotives were utilised on the line, with the B and BA classes introduced in 1957.  This was the last mainline duty performed by the B and BA locomotives, and as bridges on the SWL were strengthened, they were displaced in the 1960s by the heavier A and AB classes.  In 1969, the SWL became one of the last lines in New Zealand to be dieselised, with the DJ class introduced. DJs were used in 1968, when the line was closed for over 3 weeks by the Inangahua Earthquake and which also caused a derailment. In the 1980s, DC locomotives were also placed into service on the line.

One notable feature was the necessity to bank heavy trains heading south from Reefton to Stillwater due to the difficult uphill grade.  This was a common feature during the era of steam locomotives, and although banking was dispensed with on most lines when the conversion to diesel-electric motive power was made, the SWL was initially an exception.  Some trains had two DJ class locomotives at each end, but this practice has now come to an end, with trains usually formed and loaded in such a way that banking is unnecessary. Trains on the line are regulated by track warrants.

Stations 
Stations and sidings on the southern section of the line (those north of Westport are listed in the Seddonville Branch article) -

The table below shows Reefton as the main intermediate passenger station in 1949, but the mainstay of the line was 'goods' and 'other goods' at Waimangaroa and Granity, which were very likely mostly coal, which remains the main traffic on the line.

References

Further reading

External links 
Photos -

 1966 Ikamatua
 1967 railcars passing at Cronadun
 1958 Inangahua with railcar and goods shed
 1945 locomotive beside Cascade Creek coal bins and coal flume
 concrete arch bridge
 1920s building the line in the Buller Gorge and a suspension bridge
 1900s navvies building the line between Westport and Te Kuha
 1900s Buller Bridge on Fairwind Railway
 Westport station - early 20c, 1947, 1970
 Westport rail yard in 2012

Railway lines in New Zealand
Grey District
Buller District
Westport, New Zealand
Rail transport in the West Coast, New Zealand